Carl August may refer to:

Carl August, Crown Prince of Sweden (1768 – 1810), Danish nobleman
Carl August, Grand Duke of Saxe-Weimar-Eisenach (1757 – 1828)
Charles Augustus, Hereditary Grand Duke of Saxe-Weimar-Eisenach (1912–1988)
Charles Augustus, Hereditary Grand Duke of Saxe-Weimar-Eisenach (1912–1988)